Nazmi Yükselen (1926 – 16 March 2015) was a Turkish singer-songwriter, folk music composer.

References

1926 births
2015 deaths
Turkish singer-songwriters